Virginia Ann Sanders Downing (born June 12, 1945) is an American singer of southern gospel music and an inspirational speaker.

Early years
Born in Pittsboro, Mississippi, Downing is the daughter of Earnest and Lillie Sanders. She grew up on a farm in Calhoun County, near Bruce, Mississippi, and was 12 years younger than her only sibling, sister Lavern. As a youngster, she sang at church services and social events in the community. Before her 1963 graduation from Bruce High School, she had a successful audition with the Speer Family southern gospel group.

Career

Speer Family 
Downing began singing with the Speers when she was 18 and stayed with them for five years, during which she participated in more than 1,000 performances and was especially known for her treatments of "I Must Tell Jesus" and "On the Sunny Banks". In 1968, she left the group to marry Paul Shirley Downing Jr., who had been a bass singer with The Dixie Echoes gospel group but had become a corporate sales trainer.

The Downings 
Later in 1968, her husband suggested forming their own group, and in the spring of 1969, The Downings debuted with a performance at Bruce High School. In the summer of 1969, The Downings (described in the trade publication Billboard as "an unusually young gospel group") toured with Jimmie Davis and The Chuck Wagon Gang. Eighteen of the group's recordings reached top-20 gospel songs ranking before the group disbanded in 1978. In 1969, Downing won the first Dove Award for Female Vocalist of the Year.

Later ministries 
Following the end of the singing group, Paul and Ann Downing focused on other ministries. In 1991, while the couple was in Kentucky for an engagement, he had a heart attack, and he died about two months later. She became a solo artist after her husband's death, when she completed the tour that the couple had begun. She also continued working on plans that the couple had started for creation of the Middle Tennessee Women's Retreat. She was host of the first retreat in May 1992. She became a regular performer on Gaither Homecoming videos and has appeared on the Family Channel, TBN, and TNN television networks.

In 2020, Downing had a full schedule that mixed speaking engagements (including events for women's groups and senior adult groups) and church concerts not only in the United States and Canada, but also in some European countries. Topics on which she speaks to groups include dealing with loss of a spouse, trauma in a family, fading success, and financial ruin. She also is the author of a book, Skidmarks on the Road of Life.

In 2018, Downing was inducted into the Hall of Fame of the Southern Gospel Music Association.

References

External links 
 Ann Downing Ministries

Living people
1945 births
20th-century American women singers
20th-century women musicians
Southern gospel performers
American performers of Christian music
Singers from Mississippi
20th-century American singers
21st-century American women